The following is an episode list for the E4 series Fonejacker. The series premiered on Comedy Lab with a pilot episode, and due to much popularity, a full series started on 5 July 2007, although the series was originally going to be aired in April at some point, but was delayed. A Christmas special was aired on 20 December of the same year. Then, in 2008, a second series began on 18 September. Both series have been released on DVD including special features such as Unseen Material and audio commentaries.

Each episode is approximately 23 minutes long.

Comedy Lab Pilot: 2006 

Comedy Lab Pilot aired May 2006

Series One: 2007 

Series 1 Aired: 5 July – 9 August 2007

Series Two: 2008 

Series 2 Aired: 18 September – 22 October 2008

Christmas Specials 

Christmas Message Aired: December 2006Christmas Special Aired: 20 December 2007

Previously unseen DVD calls

References

Lists of British comedy television series episodes